Kornelia Kubińska (née Marek, born 3 August 1985 in Marklowice, Wodzisław Śląski) is a Polish cross country skier who between from 2002 and 2017. At the 2010 Winter Olympics in Vancouver, she finished sixth in the 4 × 5 km relay, ninth in the team sprint, 11th in the 30 km, 35th in the 7.5 km + 7.5 km double pursuit, and 39th in the 10 km events.

At the FIS Nordic World Ski Championships 2009 in Liberec, Kubińska finished sixth in the 4 × 5 km relay, 21st in the 30 km, 29th in the 10 km, 40th in the 7.5 km + 7.5 km double pursuit, and 66th in the individual sprint events.

Her best career finish was ninth in a 4 × 5 km relay in France in 2008 while her best individual finish was 23rd at a 10 km event in Estonia in January 2010.

On 11 March 2010 it was reported that Kubińska was tested positive for EPO by the Polish Olympic Committee. If found guilty of doping by the International Olympic Committee, Kubińska and the relay teams would be disqualified and stripped of their Vancouver results. She would also be banned from the next Winter Olympics in Sochi, Russia, in 2014. On 7 April 2010, it was announced that she will be banned from all competitions for two years.

Cross-country skiing results
All results are sourced from the International Ski Federation (FIS).

Olympic Games

World Championships

World Cup

Season standings

References

External links
 

1985 births
Cross-country skiers at the 2010 Winter Olympics
Cross-country skiers at the 2014 Winter Olympics
Doping cases in cross-country skiing
Living people
Olympic cross-country skiers of Poland
Polish female cross-country skiers
Tour de Ski skiers
Polish sportspeople in doping cases
People from Wodzisław County
Sportspeople from Silesian Voivodeship